James Blanchard (January 8, 1876 – July 17, 1952) was a farmer and political figure in Ontario. He represented Ontario North in the Legislative Assembly of Ontario from 1929 to 1934 as a Conservative member.

He was born in Leaskdale, the son of John Blanchard and Melissa Edwards, and was educated there. In 1900, he married Zella Beatrice Murray. Blanchard served on the municipal and city councils and also served as reeve. He died July 17, 1952.

References

External links

1876 births
1952 deaths
People from Uxbridge, Ontario
Progressive Conservative Party of Ontario MPPs